Renaissance of the Daleks is a Big Finish Productions audio drama based on the long-running British science fiction television series Doctor Who.

Plot
The Doctor leaves Nyssa on Earth, not knowing that she's in Rhodes during the Crusades, then ends up in the American Civil War. The Doctor meets General Tillington, an American general that has been spying on the TARDIS with actinoids. The Doctor finds out that The Dalek Invasion of Earth hasn't happened and a new Dalek invasion is coming very soon. The Doctor must try to put history right, but how can he convince General Tillington? The Doctor heads to the TARDIS. With the help of Tillington's nephew Wilton, can he save Nyssa and her friends Mulberry and Floyd from getting blown up? And can he escape the deadly "Toy Daleks"?

Cast
The Doctor — Peter Davison
Nyssa — Sarah Sutton
General Tillington — William Hope
Sergeant — Stewart Alexander
Wilton — Jon Weinberg
Mulberry — Nicholas Deal
Floyd — Richie Campbell
Alice — Regina Reagan
Dalek Voices — Nicholas Briggs

Continuity
The pocket interocitor used by Nyssa in this story is later given to Lucie Miller and used in her final stories Lucie Miller and To the Death.

Notes
Christopher H. Bidmead felt that changes made during the script-editing process were significant enough that he could not claim to be the story's sole writer.  Hence, the "from a story by" credit.

External links
Big Finish Productions – Renaissance of the Daleks

2007 audio plays
Fifth Doctor audio plays
Dalek audio plays